Marcus Thorbjörn Ericsson (born 2 September 1990) is a Swedish professional racing driver. He competes in the NTT IndyCar Series, driving the No. 8 Honda for Chip Ganassi Racing and is the 2022 Indianapolis 500 winner. Ericsson previously competed in Formula One between 2014 and 2018.

After a successful debut in car racing in 2007 which saw him take the British Formula BMW title with Fortec Motorsport, he moved up into the British team's British Formula Three Championship squad. After finishing as one of the top rookies in the category, Ericsson turned his attentions to the All-Japan Formula Three Championship where he won the championship in his debut year. In 2010, he moved up to the GP2 Series where he secured one victory during his maiden campaign for Super Nova Racing. Between 2011 and 2012, Ericsson drove for iSport.

Early career

Karting
Born in Kumla, Örebro County, Ericsson's first taste of motorsport came when he was nine years old racing in karts. "I got a call from Fredrik Ekblom, whom I ran in British Formula 3000 and Indy Lights. He now runs a kart circuit and he told me about a nine-year old kid who'd walked in off the street and nearly broke the lap record", recalled Richard Dutton, head of Fortec Motorsport. Ekblom managed to convince Ericsson's father, Tomas, to buy his son a kart and the young Swede stayed in karting for the next four years, "I'd never really thought about racing as a career. My family didn't have the money for me to race formula cars so we never thought about it", Ericsson said.

In 2006 Ericsson's career got backing from former Champ Car driver and 1999 Indianapolis 500 winner Kenny Bräck, who said:I spotted Marcus at a race in Gothenburg. He didn't win the race because his engine blew up with two laps to go but he was clearly the best out there. He didn't get caught in any battles when passing – he'd just wait for the right opportunity, then he pounced and he was away. He has such patience but when he does go for it, it measures so perfectly. He reminded me of watching Alain Prost.

Formula BMW

Bräck convinced Richard Dutton, who ran Bräck in the British Formula Three Championship in 1989, to race Ericsson for his Fortec Motorsport team's 2007 Formula BMW UK title challenge. Ericsson said of his chances during the season, "I was thinking that I should be around top eight to start with, trying for podiums and maybe wins by the end of the year". Ericsson's first win came at the first meeting of the series at Brands Hatch where he took third place in the first race and won from pole position in the second race. Following his win, Ericsson was described by Autosport as "the best young talent" Bräck had ever seen. Ericsson was in the title race for the whole season, challenging Czech Josef Král and Brit Henry Arundel. In the end, Ericsson, aged 16, won the title by 40 points from Kral, becoming the final Champion of the British Formula BMW series before the series merged with the German series to make a European championship.

Formula Three

Following his win of the Formula BMW title, Ericsson began aiming for a seat in Formula Three. Tests followed with the British Formula 3 team Räikkönen Robertson Racing as part of his prize for winning the title that year. Afterward Ericsson had a test with frontrunning Formula 3 Euro Series team ASM, later ART Grand Prix. Despite an offer to join ASM, Ericsson opted to stay in England and join Fortec's British Formula 3 team. Ericsson received with two pole positions and a handful of podium finishes, but no victories, which gave him fifth overall in the championship.

During the winter of 2008, Ericsson signed a contract with the Japanese F3 team TOM'S to compete full-time in the championship for the upcoming 2009 season. Ericsson said that he was more likely to gain the experience needed to win the Macau Grand Prix in comparison to competing further in the British championship. Ericsson won the Japanese F3 championship and also won races when making guest appearances back in British F3. He consequently participated in the Macau Grand Prix where he qualified in pole position and finished the main race in the fourth position.

GP2 Series

Ericsson moved into the GP2 Asia Series for the 2009–10 GP2 Asia Series, driving originally for the ART Grand Prix team. However, it was later confirmed that Ericsson would drive for Super Nova Racing in the 2010 GP2 Series. He had been expected to complete the rest of the Asian series with the team, but Jake Rosenzweig was signed to replace Ericsson for the final two rounds. Ericsson returned to Super Nova for the GP2 Series, partnering Josef Král and later Luca Filippi. He took his first series victory at Valencia, but only scoring points on two further occasions restricted him to seventeenth place in the drivers' championship.

Ericsson switched to the iSport International team for 2011, alongside Sam Bird. He finished sixth in the Asia series championship, and tenth in the main series championship. He remained with iSport for 2012, alongside Jolyon Palmer. He won at Spa, beginning a run of six consecutive points finishes to the end of the season, including two podium finishes. This lifted him to eighth in the championship.

In 2013, he got the chance to drive for the reigning champions DAMS, taking pole positions in Spain and Great Britain. In Germany, he won the feature race, and he continued with podium positions in Hungary, Belgium, Singapore, and Abu Dhabi to finish sixth in the championship.

Formula One
Ericsson drove for Brawn GP at the young driver test at Circuito de Jerez over three days, on 1–3 December 2009. He tested alongside IndyCar Series driver Mike Conway. Conway had the edge by three-tenths of a second, however team principal Ross Brawn commended Ericsson for his performance, saying that he had "performed very well showing exceptional maturity in his approach and feedback".

Caterham (2014) 
On 21 November 2013, It was announced that Ericsson was a candidate to drive for the Caterham F1 Team in 2014 with Kamui Kobayashi as teammate. On 21 January 2014, the team announced that Ericsson and Kobayashi would be their race driver line up for the forthcoming season, with Robin Frijns as reserve.

Ericsson qualified 20th in his debut race– the 2014 Australian Grand Prix, running 11th before he fell back with oil pressure problems. In Malaysia, he qualified last, finishing 14th in front of main rival Max Chilton. In Spain, he outqualified Kobayashi for the first time in his career, but he was behind both Marussia cars. He finished the race in 20th position, the last classified finisher. Ericsson was penalised with two penalty points and had to start from the pit lane. He finished in 11th place, just missing out on his and Caterham's first points.

After this, he suffered a crash in the rain in Hungary, when he lost control of his car on the exit of turn 3 and hit the barriers. He was unhurt, but the car was destroyed. In the  he battled with the Marussias again, losing 16th place to Chilton on the penultimate lap. In Singapore, he finished in 15th place and in Japan, he out-qualified both Marussias and Kobayashi for 19th position. He started 17th, but spun behind the safety car in heavy rain, and had to fight back from last place. He finished 17th, in front of both Marussias and Kobayashi, but his performance was overshadowed by the crash of Bianchi. At the inaugural , he qualified in a career-best 17th position, missing out on making it into Q2 by only 0.15 seconds. During the race, he started 16th but fell back, finishing 19th overall but in front of his main rivals– the other Caterham and the sole Marussia of Chilton, who both eventually retired from the race.

Despite this, Ericsson flew to Texas to commentate the race for Swedish television and secured a new drive for 2015. Ericsson terminated his contract with Caterham on 12 November.

Sauber (2015–2019)

2015 
In his first race with the team in Australia, Ericsson finished in eighth position, recording the first points-scoring finish by a Swedish driver since Stefan Johansson finished third at the 1989 Portuguese Grand Prix.

Malaysia was the first time that Ericsson made it into Q3, qualifying 10th but was ultimately promoted to 9th. He spun on the fourth lap after an unsuccessful overtaking attempt on Force India's Nico Hülkenberg which resulted in retirement. In China, Ericsson again made it into Q3 in qualifying, again qualifying 10th. He finished the race in the same position, scoring one point after Max Verstappen's engine failed with only a few laps remaining. In Bahrain he qualified outside the top 10, and held eighth position when a pit stop error caused him to fall down the field, and he ultimately finished the race in 14th position. In the first European leg of the season he finished 14th in Spain and 13th in Monaco.

In the 2015 British Grand Prix he finished 11th – just outside the points. He scored one more point before the summer break, with a 10th-place finish in Hungary, followed by another 10th position in Belgium. At the  Ericsson qualified for Q3, where he ended up 10th, before he was given a grid penalty for blocking Nico Hülkenberg in Q1. Ericsson eventually finished 9th – taking his fifth points position for the year and again being in front of teammate Felipe Nasr.

During the summer break, Sauber announced that Ericsson along with Nasr had both extended their deals with the team for the 2016 season.

2016 

In 2016, Sauber missed pre-season testing due to financial concerns hurting their car development for 2016. Ericsson was running 15th before vibrations forced his retirement in Australia and finished twelfth in Bahrain in the next round. He ran just outside the points in China but steadily dropped to sixteenth, which was still enough to finish ahead of his teammate. In Russia he recovered from contact on the first lap of the race to take 14th at the finish. In Spain he finished twelfth, but in Monaco he was deemed to be at fault for a collision with his teammate, resulting in a grid penalty for Canada that made him start from the back. The following races saw him finishing 17th in Baku and 15th in Austria, with qualifying crashes in Silverstone and Hungary forcing him to start from the pit lane.

In Monza, he finished 16th whilst in Singapore he made it into Q2 and was close to scoring his first point until a strategic error from the team. He ran close to the points in Malaysia and Suzuka, in front of his teammate in qualifying and the race. In Austin, he ran 11th for part of the race but dropped to 14th by the checkered flag, and in Mexico he recovered from a first lap crash to finish eleventh, just outside of the points. He crashed out of the race in Brazil but finished 15th in Abu Dhabi.

2017 

Ericsson's  campaign did not start well as a hydraulic issue in Australia caused him to have to retire. He qualified 14th and finished 15th in China. He struggled to match his teammate Wehrlein in Bahrain with his race ending in another retirement caused by a gearbox failure. He finished 15th in Russia, ahead of his teammate for the first time over the season. Ericsson got his best result of the season of 11th in Azerbaijan where he fought for points with his teammate. Sauber started to struggle in Monaco with Ericsson crashing into the barrier while overtaking the safety car to get on the lead lap. He finished 13th in Canada and would fail to score points for the rest of the season.

2018 

For 2018 Ericsson retained his seat at Sauber, which became the Alfa Romeo Sauber F1 team in partnership with the Italian car maker. Alongside him was new teammate Charles Leclerc. At the Bahrain Grand Prix, Ericsson finished in ninth place, scoring his first points since the 2015 Italian Grand Prix, after a total of 49 races without scoring a point. He then scored further points at the Austrian, German, Belgian, USA and Mexican Grands Prix. At the Italian Grand Prix, Ericsson had a high speed accident in second practice, when his DRS system failed, causing the car to lose control into turn 1 and slam the wall. Ericsson's car rolled three times before coming to rest on its wheels, but he was uninjured.

2019 
Just before the 2018 Russian Grand Prix it was announced that Ericsson was to be replaced at Sauber by Antonio Giovinazzi, but would remain with the team as their third driver and brand ambassador.

IndyCar

On 30 October 2018, it was announced that Ericsson would race full-time for Schmidt Peterson Motorsports in the 2019 IndyCar Series.

Schmidt Peterson Motorsports (2019): Rookie Season 
During his rookie year, Ericsson scored a podium finish at the Detroit Grand Prix. In September, he missed the Grand Prix of Portland as he was on standby for an injured Kimi Räikkönen at the Belgian Grand Prix; Räikkönen would ultimately run the race. Ericsson ended the 2019 season 17th in points.

Chip Ganassi Racing (2020–present)

2020: Sophomore Season 
Ericsson moved to Chip Ganassi Racing for the 2020 IndyCar Series season. During the pandemic shortened season he scored top ten finishes in over half of his races, with his best result being a fourth-place finish at the second race Road America.

2021: Breakout Season 
Ericsson was confirmed for longer tenure with Chip Ganassi in October 2020, re-upping for at least another two seasons. 2021 would be Ericsson's breakout year in IndyCar. Although he had middling performances compared to teammates Scott Dixon and Álex Palou before the 2021 Indianapolis 500 Ericsson would outscore both his teammates and the entire IndyCar field following the Indianapolis 500. Ericsson scored his first win in IndyCar and his first win in any category since 2013 in GP2 when he won the first race of the doubleheader in Detroit, a race in which Ericsson benefited from the misfortune of race leader Will Power after Power's car refused to restart during a formation lap following a red flag incident at the end of the race. Ericsson finished second to Josef Newgarden at Mid Ohio and picked up a second victory at the chaotic inaugural round at Nashville, putting him into contention of the series title. Although he would hold top-ten finishes throughout the rest of the season Ericsson would be mathematically eliminated from the championship after a sixth-place finish at Laguna Seca. Ericsson would end the season in 6th place in the driver's championship with 435 points.

2022: Indianapolis 500 Winner
Ericsson continued to show pace in his third season with Chip Ganassi Racing. He recorded his first podium finish on an oval at the XPEL 375 at the Texas Motor Speedway with a third-place finish. Ericsson, sporting a helmet painted in honor of his countryman and Formula One legend, Ronnie Peterson, won the 2022 Indianapolis 500 under caution after holding off Pato O'Ward on a late restart. Ericsson became the second Swedish driver to win the Indianapolis 500, after Kenny Bräck in 1999. Ericsson's win in the 500 plus solid early season results vaulted him into the points lead of the IndyCar Series championship for the first time in his career. His title challenge continued with a six-race streak of successive top ten finishes, however a second place at Road America ended up being the final podium of his campaign. The Swede finished sixth in the drivers' standings, being beaten narrowly by teammate Palou.

2023 
Ericsson started his 2023 campaign by winning the first race of the season in St. Petersburg.

Racing record

Karting career summary

Racing career summary 

* Season still in progress.

Complete GP2 Series results
(key) (Races in bold indicate pole position; races in italics indicate fastest lap)

Complete GP2 Asia Series results
(key) (Races in bold indicate pole position; races in italics indicate fastest lap)

Complete GP2 Final results
(key) (Races in bold indicate pole position) (Races in italics indicate fastest lap)

Complete Formula One results
(key) (Races in bold indicate pole position; races in italics indicate fastest lap)

† Did not finish, but was classified as he had completed more than 90% of the race distance.

American open-wheel racing results
(key)

IndyCar Series
(key)

Indianapolis 500

Complete IMSA SportsCar Championship results
(key) (Races in bold indicate pole position; races in italics indicate fastest lap)

* Season still in progress.

References

External links

1990 births
Living people
People from Kumla Municipality
Swedish racing drivers
Formula BMW UK drivers
British Formula Three Championship drivers
Japanese Formula 3 Championship drivers
GP2 Asia Series drivers
GP2 Series drivers
Swedish Formula One drivers
Caterham Formula One drivers
WeatherTech SportsCar Championship drivers
Sauber Formula One drivers
IndyCar Series drivers
Indianapolis 500 drivers
Fortec Motorsport drivers
TOM'S drivers
ART Grand Prix drivers
Super Nova Racing drivers
ISport International drivers
DAMS drivers
Arrow McLaren SP drivers
Chip Ganassi Racing drivers
Sportspeople from Örebro County
Indianapolis 500 winners
Double R Racing drivers
Carlin racing drivers
Porsche Motorsports drivers